This is a list of animated films produced in Albania.

Animated films by decade
 Animated films of the 1970s
 Animated films of the 1980s
 Animated films of the 1990s

See also
 Albanian National Center of Cinematography
 Albanian Central Film Archive
 Cinema of Kosovo

External links
 Albanian Film Database

Lists of animated films
Lists of Albanian films